Richard P. Matty was a former member of the Wisconsin State Assembly.

Biography
Matty was born on September 16, 1932, in Menominee, Michigan. He graduated from high school in Crivitz, Wisconsin. During the Korean War, Matty served in the United States Air Force. From 1966 to 1970, he was coroner of Marinette County, Wisconsin. Matty died on April 21, 2019, at 86 years old.

Political career
Matty was a member of the Wisconsin State Assembly from 1972 to 1988. He is a Republican.

References

1932 births
Republican Party members of the Wisconsin State Assembly
American coroners
Military personnel from Wisconsin
United States Air Force airmen
United States Air Force personnel of the Korean War
People from Menominee, Michigan
People from Marinette County, Wisconsin
2019 deaths